Greyware may refer to:

 Grey ware, a type of pottery made of a grey paste
 Grayware, unwanted applications or files that are not classified as malware, but can worsen the performance of computers and cause security risks
 Greyware Automation Products, a time synchronization software manufacturer; see Control Panel (Windows)